
Gmina Rychliki (german: Reichenbach)is a rural gmina (administrative district) in Elbląg County, Warmian-Masurian Voivodeship, in northern Poland.

Villages
Gmina Rychliki contains the villages and settlements of Barzyna, Buczyniec, Budki, Dymnik, Dziśnity, Gołutowo, Grądowy Młyn, Jankowo, Jelonki, Kiersity, Krupin, Kwietniewo, Lepno, Liszki, Marwica, Marwica Wielka, Mokajmy, Powodowo, Protowo, Rejsyty, Rychliki, Śliwice, Sójki, Świdy, Święty Gaj, Topolno Wielkie, Wopity and Wysoka.

Neighbouring gminas
Gmina Rychliki is bordered by the gminas of Dzierzgoń, Elbląg, Małdyty, Markusy, Pasłęk and Stary Dzierzgoń.

References
Polish official population figures 2006

Rychliki
Elbląg County